God Is My Co-Pilot (often abbreviated as GodCo) is a no wave queercore band from New York City formed in 1991. The two primary members throughout the 90s were the openly queer couple of vocalist Sharon Topper and guitarist Craig Flanagin. The last recordings with Topper were made in 1998 (though the group continued to perform occasionally until 2012).

There was no further activity until 2018 when the band released a demo on both cassette and Bandcamp, began playing frequent shows in NYC, and toured the UK. The current line-up consists of Flanagin playing guitar, Normandy Sherwood (of the National Theater of the United States of America) on vocals & electronics, long-standing members Jason Blackkat on bass, Jer Reid on guitar, and Fredrik Haake on drums, with new members Hajnal Pivnick on violin, and Kevin Shea on drums.

The group has been recording new music since 2018; both a single and an album drawn from these recordings, which include contributions from cellist Fred Lonberg-Holm, drummer Genny Slag, and guitarist Mark Jickling, are slated for release in 2022.

God Is My Co-Pilot is known for being prolific (see discography below). All of their material has been released on independent record labels or self-released. Their own self-run label The Making Of Americans (named after the novel of the same name by Gertrude Stein) released music by Jad Fair, Cat Power, Dairy Queen Empire, Dawson, and The Scissor Girls among others.   

Former members of God Is My Co-Pilot include keyboardist Anthony Coleman, vocalist/bassist Fly; bassists James Garrison, Alex Klein, Daria Grace and Ann Rupel; cellist Fred Lonberg-Holm; and drummers Dan Brown, Michael Evans, and Siobhan Duffy. 

The group is often joined by guest musicians. These have included Frank London, Kenny Wollesen, Sandy Ewen, Margaret Fiedler McGinnis, Elliott Sharp, Marion Coutts, Jim Sauter, Catherine Jauniaux, Gen Ken Montgomery, Andy Haas, John Zorn and Jad Fair.

The band's lyrics frequently address sexuality and gender. The band states, in their song, "We Signify, "...We're co-opting rock, the language of sexism, to address gender identity on its own terms of complexity...." They occasionally sing in languages other than English: some of their output has been in French, Quebecois, Cajun, Swabian, Yiddish, German, Finnish, Turkish, among others. Their sound has been described as experimental, noise rock, hardcore punk and avant jazz. Stay Free zine said of the music, "We hear a new sound, 'free punk' we'll call it."

Discography

Albums
I Am Not This Body (1992) Making Of Americans
Speed Yr. Trip (1992) Making Of Americans
Straight Not (1993) Outpunk
What Doctors Don't Tell You (1993) Shrimper Records
Getting Out of Boring Time Biting Into Boring Pie (1993) Quinnah Records
How To Be (1994) Making Of Americans
Sex is For Making Babies (1994) Disques Du Soleil Et De L'acier
Mir Shlufn Nisht (1994) Avant Records
Puss 02 (1995) Dark Beloved Cloud
Children Can Be So Cruel (1997)
Get Busy (1998) Atavistic Records

Compilations/Live
Tight Like Fist (1993) Knitting Factory
History Of Music: Vol 1 1989-1991 (1995) Meldac [Japan]
History Of Music: Vol 2 1991-1993 (1996) Meldac [Japan]
Peel Sessions (1996) Strange Fruit
The Best Of (1996) Atavistic
Je Suis Trop Content (1997) Dark Beloved Cloud

Singles
Songs of Praise (1991)
Refused Medical Attention (1991)
On A Wing And A Prayer (1992) Funky Mushroom
Gender is As Gender Does (1992) Funky Mushroom
How I Got Over  (1993) Ajax Records
My Sinister Hidden Agenda (1993) Blackout Records
Pissing and Hooting (1993) Dark Beloved Cloud
Illusions Of Secrecy (1993) Dark Beloved Cloud
When you See This Remember Me (1993) Dark Beloved Cloud
Probable Cause; Life under Occupation; Held Down God Is My Co-Pilot/ Fifth Column split single (1993) Outpunk
Ykt Flot! (1993)
Sharon Quite Fancies Jo (1994) Soul Static Sound
This Is No Time To Be Frail (1994) Rough Trade Records
Kitty Bait (1994) Ajax
Butch Flip God Is My Co-Pilot/ Melt Banana split single (1994)
An Appeal To Reason (1995) Runt Records
Ootko sä poika vai tyttö? (1995) Trash Can
God Is My Co-Pilot / Bz Bz Ueu  split 7-inch (1998) (Music à la Coque)
Erase-yer-head No. 9 [split EP with Melt Banana, Tear of a Doll, Camp Blackfoot] (1999) Pandemonium

Compilation appearances
"Anatomically Correct" on Rock Stars Kill (1994) Kill Rock Stars

References

External links
God Is My Co-Pilot Runway
Bandcamp Page
Facebook (Official)

Queercore groups
American noise rock music groups
Hardcore punk groups from New York (state)
Musical groups from New York City
Atavistic Records artists
Shrimper Records artists
Knitting Factory Records artists
1991 establishments in New York City